Invasion of the Scream Queens is a 1992 documentary film by American filmmaker Donald Farmer. The film interviews the women who have made a career out of starring in the B horror and science fiction genres are interviewed, and clips and trailers from their films are shown. It was produced by Mondo Video (1992) (USA) and released on VHS format.

Cast
Michelle Bauer as herself
Martine Beswick as herself
Janus Blythe as herself
Veronica Carothers as herself
Ruth Collins as herself
Monique Gabrielle as herself
Marya Gant as herself
Katina Garner as herself
Liz Kagan as herself
Elizabeth Kaitan as herself
Melissa Moore as herself
Tammara Souza as herself
Deborah Stern as herself
Brinke Stevens as herself
Mary Woronov as herself

See also
 List of documentaries

References

External links 

1992 films
American documentary films
Documentary films about women in film
Women in horror film
Documentary films about horror
1990s American films